David Castell is an American record producer, musician, and recording engineer based in Dallas, Texas.

Castell's recording career spans nearly three decades; his work with many major record labels and independent labels alike includes both platinum-selling national recording artists and unsigned regional acts, and a wide range of musical genres.

He has been instrumental in career albums of Blue October, Burden Brothers, Course of Empire, Deep Blue Something, and SouthFM.

In spring 2008, Castell began production of the Toadies’ album No Deliverance, which was released on August 19th, 2008, on Kirtland Records.

After two years of collaboration with DFW-based electronic band Shock of Pleasure, their first full-length album Its About Time, was released on September 16th, 2008, by Universal Music Group, produced by David Castell.

Blue October's two disc set, Foiled For The Last Time, features a re-release of "Calling You", also produced by David Castell.  Castell has also been named as the producer of Blue October's forthcoming 7th studio album Sway.

Productions

 Deep Blue Something – Home (1994)
 Burden Brothers – Buried in Your Black Heart (2003)
 Blue October – History for Sale (2003)
 Burden Brothers – Mercy (2006)
 Blue October – Foiled (2006)
 Toadies – No Deliverance (2008)
 Blowing Trees – Blowing Trees (2008)
 Smile Smile – Truth on Tape (2010)
 Pawn Shop Gentlemen – The Breaks (2011)
 Meridian – Meridian EP (2012)
 Blue October – Sway (2013)

References

[ David Castell on Allmusic]
 David Castell on MSN Music
 David Castell on Artist Direct

External links
David Castell Productions – Official Site
MySpace page
EQ Magazine interview with David Castell
Shock Of Pleasure
[ Toadies at Allmusic]

Record producers from Texas
Year of birth missing (living people)
Living people
People from Dallas